Feargal Sharkey is the debut solo album by former Undertones singer Feargal Sharkey, released in 1985. The album peaked at No. 12 in the UK and contains Sharkey's best known single, "A Good Heart", his only No. 1. "You Little Thief" also became a top 10 hit in the UK Singles Chart, reaching No. 5, and "Someone to Somebody" reached No. 64.

Track listing

Personnel
Feargal Sharkey – lead vocals, synthesizer, percussion, sequencer programming, backing vocals, design concept
Dean Garcia – bass
Richard Morcombe – guitar
Davey Payne – flute, saxophone
Dave Plews – trumpet
Jimmy Z – harmonica
Olle Romo – drums
Patrick Seymour – keyboards
Molly Duncan – saxophone
Michael Kamen – string arrangement, conductor
 Debra Byrd – backing vocals
 Freida Williams – backing vocals
Martin Chambers – drums
Nathan East – bass
David A. Stewart – guitar, backing vocals
Technical
Jon Bavin, Michael Schuman, Robin Laine, Tom Nist – engineer
Don Smith, Shelly Yakus – mixing
Hugh Brown – front cover photography

Chart performance

Year-end charts

References

External links
Feargal Sharkey @Discogs.com

1985 debut albums
Feargal Sharkey albums
Albums produced by David A. Stewart
Virgin Records albums
Albums recorded at The Church Studios